Mathilde Dolgopol de Sáez (6 March 1901 – 29 June 1957) was an Argentinian vertebrate paleontologist. She has “the distinction of being the first female vertebrate paleontologist in Latin America.”

Biography
Mathilde Dolgopol de Sáez was born on 6 March 1901 in La Plata, Argentina. After completing her schooling, she continued her higher studies at La Plata Museum.

In 1927 she did her doctoral thesis on invertebrate paleontology under the mentorship of Ángel Cabrera (1879-1960), who came from Spain, served as head of the department of paleontology in the museum. She later started her professional career at the La Plata Museum. 

The major part of her research was conducted between 1927 and 1940. Her research publications were mainly focused on fossil fish and birds.

She died in La Plata on 29 June 1957.

References

 1901 births
 1957 deaths
People from La Plata
Argentine paleontologists
Argentine women scientists